In the area of modern Portugal a significant number of towns with Celtic toponymic were already mentioned by ancient Greek and Roman authors. 

The regions where we can find a greater number of these names are in the north (inhabited by the Callaici or Callaeci) and center (inhabited by the Lusitanians) of Portugal. 
However, Celtic toponymy occurs throughout the whole country and is also found in the south (the Alentejo, inhabited by the Celtici, and the Algarve, inhabited by the Cynetes), which correspond to the ancient Roman provinces of Gallaecia and Lusitania.

The name of Portugal (Portvgalliæ) itself is partly of Celtic origin (see: Name of Portugal and Portus Cale).

List of towns and places

List of rivers

References

 Falileyev. Dictionary of Continental Celtic Place-Names. Aberystwyth University
 Dictionary of Greek and Roman Geography
 Gamito, Teresa. The Celts in Portugal. Universidade do Algarve. E-Keltoi. Journal of Interdisciplinary Celtic Studies. Volume 6. The Celts in the Iberian Peninsula]
 Freire,José. "A Toponímia Céltica e os vestígios de cultura material da Proto-História de Portugal". Revista de Guimarães, Volume Especial, I, Guimarães, 1999, pp. 265–275
 Mapa pormenorizado dos Povos Pré-Romanos da Península Ibérica (200 AC)
 
 Vias Romanas em Portugal
 Juan, Alonso. -Briga Toponyms in the Iberian Peninsula. University of Salamanca. E-Keltoi. Journal of Interdisciplinary Celtic Studies. Volume 6. "The Celts in the Iberian Peninsula"
 Buchanan, George.  The history of Scotland... to the present time. pg 108
 Hazlitt, The Classical Gazetteer. Ancient Library. pg 190]
 Braganca Bragança, or Braganza, or Brigantia, or Juliobriga (Portugal) Encyclopædia Britannica online
 Atlas das Cidades Romanas em Portugal
 "Corumbriga" The Cambrian Journal. Cambrian Institute p 183
 Ptolemy's Geography. Book II, Chapter 4. Location of Lusitania Hispania (Second Map of Europe.Lacus Curtius]
 Perestrello da Câmara, Paulo.  Diccionario geographico, historico, politico e litterario do reino de Portugal e seus Domínios pg 494 (two Mirobrigas)
 Bautista de Castro, João. Mappa de Portugal, pg 18 (Catraleucus)
 Pérez Vilatela, Luciano. Lusitania: Historia y etnología pg.7 (two Arcobrigas in Lusitânia)
 Memorias de la Real Academia de la historia. pg 81 Real Academia de la Historia. (three Arcobrigas)
 Alarcão,Jorge. Notas de arqueologia, epigrafia e toponímia – II
 Guerra, Amílcar. Caepiana: uma reavaliação crítica do problema da sua localização e enquadramento histórico. IPA Ministério da Cultura. (Longroiva)
 Alarcão,Jorge. Notas de arqueologia, epigrafia e toponímia – III (Valabriga-Merobriga)
 Guerra, Amílcar. POVOS, CULTURA E LÍNGUA NO OCIDENTE PENINSULAR: UMA PERSPECTIVA, A PARTIR DA TOPONOMÁSTICA Acta Palaeohispanica IX Palaeohispanica 5, (2005), pp 814–817]
 Los topónimos: Sus blasones y trofeos (la toponimia Mítica) pg 10 (Anobrega)
 Nascentes, Antenor. (1932) Dicionário etimológico da língua portuguesa. (ref. Xabregas)

See also 
 Roman Geography of Portugal
 List of Celtic place names in Galicia
 List of Latin place names in Iberia
 List of Celtic place names in Italy

Portugal
Celtic Portugal
Portugal
Portugal
Portugal
 
Portugal